Fjelldal is a village in Tjeldsund Municipality in Troms og Finnmark county, Norway. The village is located on the eastern bank of the Tjeldsundet strait in the northeastern part of the municipality. The village is located about halfway between the villages of Ramsund and Evenskjer.

The  village has a population (2011) of 320. Fjelldal Chapel is located in this village.

References

Tjeldsund
Villages in Troms og Finnmark
Populated places of Arctic Norway